Yadin Zaris (born 14 May 1990) is an Israeli striker player who currently plays for Israeli side Hapoel Azor.

External links
 
 HLSZ 

Living people
1990 births
Israeli footballers
Association football forwards
Maccabi Herzliya F.C. players
Standard Liège players
Újpest FC players
Sint-Truidense V.V. players
Hakoah Maccabi Amidar Ramat Gan F.C. players
Hapoel Jerusalem F.C. players
Hapoel Hod HaSharon F.C. players
Hapoel Azor F.C. players
Israeli Premier League players
Liga Leumit players
Challenger Pro League players
Nemzeti Bajnokság I players
Israeli expatriate footballers
Expatriate footballers in Belgium
Expatriate footballers in Hungary
Israeli expatriate sportspeople in Belgium
Israeli expatriate sportspeople in Hungary
Footballers from Herzliya